Squire Oldsapp is a 1678 comedy play by the English writer Thomas D'Urfey. Staged by the Duke's Company at the Dorset Garden Theatre in London, the original cast included Thomas Betterton as Welfore, William Smith as Henry, John Crosby as Lovell, James Nokes as  Squire Oldsapp, Anthony Leigh as Sir Frederick Banter, Samuel Sandford as  Colonel Buff, Cave Underhill as Pimpo, Emily Price as Christina and Elizabeth Currer as Madame Tricklove.

References

Bibliography
 Van Lennep, W. The London Stage, 1660-1800: Volume One, 1660-1700. Southern Illinois University Press, 1960.

1678 plays
West End plays
Restoration comedy
Plays by Thomas d'Urfey